Infante António of Portugal (Lisbon, 15 March 1695 - Lisbon, 20 October 1757) was a Portuguese infante (prince), the third surviving son of Peter II, King of Portugal, and his wife Maria Sophia of Neuburg.

Life

António Francisco Xavier Benedito Teodósio Leopoldo Henrique was born in Lisbon on March 15, 1695.

Death
He died unmarried and without legitimate issue in the same city on October 20, 1757 and is buried at the Royal Pantheon of the Braganza Dynasty, in Lisbon. Through his natural son, Duarte, he is an ancestor of famous Brazilian lawyer and writer José de Alencar.

Ancestry

1695 births
1757 deaths
People from Lisbon
Portuguese infantes
17th-century Portuguese people
18th-century Portuguese people
Burials at the Monastery of São Vicente de Fora
Sons of kings